Elmer M. Matthews (October 18, 1927 – February 5, 2015) was an American lawyer and politician who served three terms in the New Jersey General Assembly.

Born in Orange, New Jersey, Matthews received his bachelor's degree from the University of Notre Dame, his master's degree in taxation from New York University, and his law degree from Fordham University Law School. He then served in the United States Army. Matthews practiced law. Matthews served in the New Jersey General Assembly and was the speaker. He died in Sea Girt, New Jersey.

Notes

1927 births
2015 deaths
People from Orange, New Jersey
People from Sea Girt, New Jersey
University of Notre Dame alumni
New York University alumni
Fordham University School of Law alumni
New Jersey lawyers
Speakers of the New Jersey General Assembly
Democratic Party members of the New Jersey General Assembly
Politicians from Essex County, New Jersey
20th-century American lawyers